Gilbert Pogosyan (born 1 November 1988 in Artashat) is an Armenian footballer who is currently without a club.

Youth and Amateur 
Pogosyan grew up in Verdugo City, California in the United States, and played college soccer at Pasadena City College, where he was a team-mate of fellow Armenian soccer player Hagop Chirishian.

Professional 
Pogosyan signed his first professional contract in 2010 when he was signed by AC St. Louis of the USSF Division 2 Professional League. He made his professional debut on 22 April 2010 in a game against Portland Timbers.

International 
Pogosyan has played soccer twice at the Pan-Armenian Games in 2007 and 2009, representing the Armenian American community.

References

External links
 AC St. Louis bio

1988 births
Living people
American soccer players
Armenian footballers
AC St. Louis players
Soviet emigrants to the United States
Soccer players from California
American people of Armenian descent
USSF Division 2 Professional League players
Association football midfielders
Pasadena City College alumni
Sportspeople from Glendale, California
Junior college men's soccer players in the United States